Alexandra Vinogradova (born ) is a Russian female volleyball player, playing as a l. She was part of the Russia women's national volleyball team.

She participated in the 2013 FIVB Volleyball World Grand Prix.
On club level she played for Zarechie-Odinzovo in 2013.

References

External links

1988 births
Living people
Russian women's volleyball players
Place of birth missing (living people)
20th-century Russian women
21st-century Russian women